German submarine U-903 was a Type VIIC U-boat of Nazi Germany's Kriegsmarine during World War II.

She was ordered on 16 July 1942, and was laid down on 25 August 1942 at Flender Werke AG, Lübeck, as yard number 329. She was launched on 17 July 1943 and commissioned under the command of Leutnant zur See Hans Hellmann on 4 September 1943.

Design
German Type VIIC submarines were preceded by the shorter Type VIIB submarines. U-903 had a displacement of  when at the surface and  while submerged. She had two shafts and two  propellers.

U-903 was fitted with five  torpedo tubes (four fitted at the bow and one at the stern), fourteen torpedoes or 26 TMA mines, one  SK C/35 naval gun, (220 rounds), one  Flak M42 and two twin  C/30 anti-aircraft guns. The boat had a complement of between 44 — 52 men.

Service history
On 5 May 1945, U-903 was scuttled in the Gelting Bay near Gelting. She was later raised and broken up in 1947.

References

Bibliography

External links

German Type VIIC submarines
U-boats commissioned in 1943
World War II submarines of Germany
Ships built in Lübeck
1943 ships
Operation Regenbogen (U-boat)
Maritime incidents in May 1945